A list of animated television series first aired in 1989.

Anime

See also
 List of animated feature films of 1989
 List of Japanese animation television series of 1989

References

Television series
Animated series
1989
1989
1989-related lists